Arkansas Highway 176 (AR 176, Ark. 176, and Hwy. 176) is the designation for a state highway which is located in Central Arkansas. The highway is split into two sections. The first section begins at Interstate 40 (I-40) and AR 365 in North Little Rock and ends at Camp Robinson Road and Remount Road in North Little Rock. The second section begins at AR 107 in Sherwood and ends at Rixie Road in Sherwood. AR 176 also has a spur route (signed as Highway 176Y or AR 176Y), which intersects US Route 67/US Route 167 (US 67/US 167) southbound.

Route description

Camp Robinson Road (North Little Rock route) 

AR 176 begins at I-40 (via exit 152B westbound) and AR 365 in North Little Rock, in the Levy subdivision. The route heads north, before intersecting Camp Robinson Road. AR 176 follows Camp Robinson Road for about  before reaching its eastern terminus at the intersection of Remount Road and Camp Robinson Road.

Kiehl Avenue (Sherwood route) 

AR 176 begins at AR 107 in Sherwood. The route heads east for about  before intersecting US 67/US 167 northbound. The route ends at Rixie Road in Sherwood, shortly after its intersection with US 67/US 167. The route itself is locally referred to as Kiehl Avenue for its entire length.

Major intersections

Spur route 

Highway 176Y (AR 176Y, Ark. 176Y, Hwy. 176Y) is a very short spur route which connects AR 176 with US 67/US 167 southbound frontage road. The route is accessible via exit 4 northbound.

References

External links

176
Transportation in Pulaski County, Arkansas